Henderson Edward Boyd (January 23, 1893 – August 1962) was an American baseball right fielder in the Negro leagues. He played with the Chicago American Giants in 1920.

References

External links
 and Seamheads

Chicago American Giants players
1893 births
1962 deaths
Baseball players from St. Louis
Baseball outfielders
20th-century African-American sportspeople